NordPass is a proprietary password manager launched in 2019. It is meant to help its users to organise their passwords and secure notes, keeping them in a single place — an encrypted password vault. This service comes in both free and premium versions, though the free version lacks much of the paid functionality like multi-device login.

NordPass is a cross-platform application available on Windows, macOS, Linux, Android, and iOS. It also offers browser extensions on Google Chrome, Mozilla Firefox, Microsoft Edge, Brave, Opera, and Safari.

History
NordPass was developed by the same cybersecurity team  that created NordVPN, a VPN service provider.

Security features

 NordPass is built with the ChaCha20 encryption algorithm specifically the XChaCha variant.
 NordPass has zero-knowledge architecture, meaning that passwords are encrypted on the user's device and only then stored in the cloud. This way, NordPass cannot view, edit, or in any other way manage users’ passwords.
 An encrypted vault acts as a digital safe where users can store login credentials, secure notes, and credit card details.
 The Master Password serves as the key that unlocks the encrypted vault. Master Password protects the user's passwords, but it's up to the user to make it strong.
 NordPass provides two-factor authentication (2FA). It supports multiple authentication apps, including Google Authenticator, Duo, and Authy. 
In its latest release it includes FIDO U2F support. This means that it will now work with YubiKey and other third party security keys. Though this protection is embedded at the service login instead of the app which is a weakness.
NordPass provides a Secure Password Sharing Feature which allows for the secure sharing of passwords between NordPass users.
NordPass can scan data breaches for password leaks.
NordPass can identify weak, reused, or old passwords which it divides into Weak, Reused, and Old.

An independent cybersecurity firm, Cure53, in February 2020 conducted an audit and confirmed the security of NordPass password manager.

NordPass is based in Panama, which has no mandatory data retention laws and does not participate in the Five Eyes or Fourteen Eyes alliances. This means that the company isn't required by law to keep logs or share them with governments.

Reception
NordPass is a relatively new player in the password manager market and was named “new kid on the block”. Some tech review sites have noticed that it still lacks some features. According to PC Mag, “it offers very few advanced features such as form-filling, folders, security monitoring, or 2FA key support”.

NordPass has conducted a number of research studies. NordPass has also been mentioned on many influential tech websites, such as Wired, Forbes, Business Insider, and TechRadar.

References 

Password managers